Gridino is a rural locality (a village) in Lipetskoye Rural Settlement, Verkhovazhsky District, Vologda Oblast, Russia. The population was 35 as of 2002.

Geography 
Gridino is located 16 km south of Verkhovazhye (the district's administrative centre) by road. Lymzino is the nearest rural locality.

References 

Rural localities in Verkhovazhsky District